USNS Yukon (T-AO-202) is a  underway replenishment oiler operated by the Military Sealift Command to support ships of the United States Navy.

Yukon, the sixteenth ship of the Henry J. Kaiser class, was laid down at Avondale Shipyard, Inc., at New Orleans, Louisiana, on 13 May 1991 and launched on 6 February 1993. She entered non-commissioned U.S. Navy service under the control of the Military Sealift Command with a primarily civilian crew on 25 March 1994. She serves in the United States Pacific Fleet.

On 27 February 2000, Yukon collided with a smaller civilian cargo ship while entering the port of Dubai in the Persian Gulf.

No one on either ship was injured, and there were no fuel leaks, but Yukon suffered major damage, including several large holes and dents above the water line on her starboard quarter, while a 40-foot (12.2 m) hole was torn in Denvers bow from the second deck to the waterline. The investigation into the accident found Denver responsible. Both ships went to the Pearl Harbor Naval Shipyard at Pearl Harbor, Hawaii, for repairs. Yukon then transited to San Francisco, California, for further repairs at the same time as her scheduled routine overhaul. Yukon returned to service in January 2001.

On 16 May 2012, Yukon collided with the amphibious assault ship  after Essex suffered an apparent steering malfunction upon approach for an underway replenishment. There were no injuries and no loss of fuel was reported. Both vessels were able to continue to San Diego, California, under their own power. The crew of the USS Essex was blamed in a report.

Notes and references

External links
 Military Sealift Command Ship Inventory USNS Yukon (T-AO-202)
 NavSource Online: Service Ship Photo Archive: USNS Yukon (T-AO-202)
 USNS Yukon (T-AO-202)
 Collision of USNS Yukon and USS Denver July 14, 2000
 MSC press release Jan 1, 2001 returning Yukon to duty following collision

 

Henry J. Kaiser-class oilers
Ships built in Bridge City, Louisiana
1993 ships